Robert Joseph Galasso (born January 13, 1952) is an American former professional baseball pitcher. One highlight of Galasso's brief MLB career was picking up a win in relief during a marathon 20 inning game vs the Red Sox on September 3, 1981. Galasso pitched three scoreless innings (17th, 18th and 19th) to earn the victory for the Mariners.

Galasso made 55 appearances in the major leagues (eight starts).

References

External links
, or Retrosheet, or Pura Pelota

1952 births
Living people
Aberdeen Pheasants players
American expatriate baseball players in Canada
Asheville Orioles players
Baseball players from Pennsylvania
Bluefield Orioles players
Key West Sun Caps players
Lodi Orions players
Major League Baseball pitchers
Milwaukee Brewers players
Navegantes del Magallanes players
American expatriate baseball players in Venezuela
New Orleans Pelicans (baseball) players
Orlando Juice players
People from Connellsville, Pennsylvania
Richmond Braves players
Robert Morris University alumni
Rochester Red Wings players
Seattle Mariners players
Spokane Indians players
Sun City Rays players
Tiburones de La Guaira players
Toledo Mud Hens players
Vancouver Canadians players
Nettuno Baseball Club players
American expatriate baseball players in Italy